Karsten Anker Solhaug (9 November 1914 – 26 August 2012) was a Norwegian salvationist.

He was born in Porsgrunn. He headed the Salvation Army in Norway from 1975 to 1982. He died in 2012.

References

1914 births
2012 deaths
Norwegian Salvationists
People from Porsgrunn
20th-century Methodists